Port Huron High School (PHHS) was founded in 1868, and has been in continuous operation as a secondary school in Port Huron, Michigan since then.

PHHS athletic teams competed in the Eastern Michigan League (EML) until the 1990s; upon dissolution of the EML, PHHS joined the Macomb Area Conference (MAC). The athletic teams are known as the "Big Reds", a reference to the school colors—red, white and black.

Alumni
Chad Nicefield - lead singer of the band Wilson

References

External links

Public high schools in Michigan
Port Huron, Michigan
Schools in St. Clair County, Michigan
Michigan State Historic Sites
Educational institutions established in 1868
1868 establishments in Michigan